Cyber Intelligence House, formerly Kinkayo, is a Singapore-based cyber intelligence agency, which specializes in cyber exposure. The company detects and monitors cyber exposure via dark web, deep web, and data breaches to alert individuals and businesses about potential cyber threats.

Cyber Exposure Index
The Cyber Exposure Index (CEI), the company's research-driven project, is the world's first proprietary global scoring system that calculates the exposure index of listed companies based on exposed credentials, hacker-group activity and leaked sensitive information.  CEI is sort of a cyber risk score given to public companies listed on stock exchanges hosted in 11 countries (Australia, Finland, Germany, Hong Kong, Indonesia, Italy, South Africa, UK, US, Malaysia, and Singapore). The CEI scores about 6,000 listed companies on their levels of exposure, after analyzing data collected on each company from publicly available sources in the dark web and deep web, and published data breaches. Companies evaluated are given a score ranging from 0 to 300+, with 0 indicating no exposure over the past 12 months and 300+ indicating that the company represents the top 10% most exposed companies globally. The index was first launched in October 2017; the results concluded that publicly listed companies in Australia, Hong Kong and Singapore were least exposed to cyber threats. In October 2018, the results were updated and Singapore, Malaysia and Indonesia were earmarked as least exposed countries in the world. This has also led to speculation that cyber threat exposure is very location centric. Asia Pacific firms tend to have lower exposure than their American or EU counterparts. The CEI faced some negative press in South Africa, when it was ranked as the 3rd most exposed country in October 2017. The South African Banking Risk Information Center (SABRIC) speculated that the research findings might cause unnecessary fear, uncertainty and doubt.

Hacked
Hacked is a cyber exposure monitoring app for individuals, launched in June 2018. The aim of this Android application is to alert people, whenever any sensitive information is compromised. It provides free e-mail account monitoring. However, with a premium plan subscription, users can monitor credit cards, usernames, ID numbers, and physical addresses as well.

References

External links

Computer security software companies
Software companies of Singapore